Origanum onites, the Cretan oregano, Greek oregano, pot marjoram or Ellinikí rίgani in Greek (Ελληνική ρίγανη), is a plant species in the genus Origanum found in Sicily, Greece and Turkey. It has similar flavors as oregano. Its essential oil can be distinguished from other species such as Greek oregano (Origanum vulgare ssp. hirtum). It has antimicrobial activities.

Chemistry
The plant contains the chemical compounds thymol, carvacrol and cedrol.

References

External links

onites
Plants described in 1753
Flora of Turkey
Flora of Sicily
Flora of Greece
Medicinal plants
Taxa named by Carl Linnaeus